Karaoke Joysound Wii (カラオケJOYSOUND Wii) is a karaoke video game by Hudson Soft for Wii. It licenses the Joysound online song library from Japanese karaoke service provider Xing, who also helped co-develop the game with Hudson. The game was originally released in a retail package with an included USB microphone on December 18, 2008 in Japan, and was later released there as a downloadable WiiWare game on July 28, 2009.

In January 2012, Konami (which acquired Hudson Soft and all its original IPs in 2011) announced they would release the title for the first time in North America under the simplified title Karaoke Joysound, which connected to a much different music library of well-known English songs. It was originally expected for a March 2012 release, but was delayed until October 30, 2012, and was made available as both a standard disc and a microphone bundle. On July 17, 2014, the software was re-released as a downloadable WiiWare title, without any prior announcements, for the North American Wii Shop Channel, courtesy of publishers Brother International Corp. It was originally announced for a July 3 release, but it was delayed for unknown reasons.

The software is spiritually succeeded by the Joysound-licensed Wii Karaoke U app for the Wii U in 2012, and  it is only available in Japan and Europe. On May 18, 2015, Konami announced the termination of the online Joysound service. Last date to purchase songs was July 21, 2015 and the service was shut down on October 29, 2015. A successor for the Nintendo Switch named Karaoke Joysound Switch was developed by Xing (who worked on the original games) and published by Nintendo. It was released only in Japan in 2017.

Overview
Karaoke Joysound Wii is a game "designed to provide a karaoke-club experience at home". The game requires an internet connection for players to access new songs to download. Buying tickets for songs with Nintendo Points, players rent the songs they want to sing for a limited period (from 24 hours to up to 90 days) from Xing's song library. Choosing a stage to perform on, players are able to select from a previously created avatar or use their own Miis to represent themselves. Players are also able to adjust options such as echo, key and speed of the song, and other players can use their Wii Remotes to accompany the singer by playing instruments such as cymbals and maracas.

In addition to the included microphone, the retail version includes 70 songs on disc as well as a lesson mode which trains and quizzes players on tone and rhythm, and a party mode with five minigames. Along with omitting the included songs and extra modes, the WiiWare version features a number of cosmetic changes.

Reception
In the six months after release, the retail version of Karaoke Joysound Wii sold over 250,000 copies in Japan.

Joysound Yearly Chart
Joysound published Top10 songs in Heisei (1989-2019).

See also
Oricon Karaoke Chart

References

External links

Official website (in Japanese)
The complete history of Karaoke

2008 video games
Karaoke video games
Nintendo Wi-Fi Connection games
Video games developed in Japan
WiiWare games
Wii-only games
Wii games
Wii Wi-Fi games
Karaoke
Products and services discontinued in 2015
Defunct games
Multiplayer and single-player video games